Fred Griffith (born October 1, 1964) is an American actor and producer.

Early life
Griffith was born Freddy Merrill Griffith, the son of Victor Merrill Griffith and Linda Gayle Griffith, in Spartanburg, SC. Griffith is of Welsh and Scots-Irish ancestry. His ancestors fought in the American Revolutionary War, The Civil War in the United States, World War I, World War II, Korean War, and Vietnam War. He has a younger sister, Cynthia Lynn. From an early age he knew he wanted to be an entertainer. He studied at University of South Carolina, Spartanburg and Coastal Carolina. He waited to pursue his life's passion of being a professional actor until he was in his thirties.

Career
He has been fortunate enough to work alongside of some of his childhood heroes, such as Robert Duvall in Gods and Generals and David Carradine in Miracle at Creek. He earned his SAG card in 2002 while working on Gods and Generals. The first film he produced was a short entitled Alex and it was nominated for an award at the Myrtle Beach Film Festival for "Best Ensemble". In 2004 he formed Follow Your Dreams Productions, a film production company. Also in 2004 he presented the Elvis Presley Award to the country music group Lonestar for their song "I'm Already There" on the American Veteran Awards show on The History Channel. Although he has never served in the United States Military he was told by a five star General that tonight he was serving his country by supporting them.

Filmography

Television

Producer

References
 Fred Griffith Biography (1964-)

External links

American male film actors
American male television actors
People from Spartanburg, South Carolina
Living people
1964 births